The Twenty Thirteen Tour was a concert tour by industrial rock band Nine Inch Nails to support the album Hesitation Marks. It marked the return of the band for live performances after a four-year touring hiatus. It began on July 26, 2013 and ended on August 30, 2014.

Background
In February 2009, Trent Reznor stated, "I've been thinking for some time now it's time to make NIN disappear for a while.", indicating the possible end of the act. Nine Inch Nails then embarked on a tour with Jane's Addiction, dubbed NIN|JA. Afterwards, Reznor clarified that the band is done with touring for the foreseeable future but he will continue to make music under the moniker. Nine Inch Nails' final live performance was September 10, 2009 at the Wiltern Theater in Los Angeles. Reznor also sold numerous performance gears, which include instruments, staging, amplifiers and effects units on eBay after the last concert. Since the final show, until the release of Hesitation Marks in 2013, Reznor released only two tracks as Nine Inch Nails: the theme song for the film, Tetsuo: The Bullet Man and a cover of "Zoo Station" by U2, for the tribute album AHK-toong BAY-bi Covered.

Reznor began pursuing other projects. In 2010, he formed the post-industrial project, How to Destroy Angels with long-time collaborator Atticus Ross and West Indian Girl frontwoman Mariqueen Maandig, to whom he was married in 2009. In 2010, the band released their self-titled EP, which was followed by An omen EP_ in 2012 and their debut album, Welcome Oblivion, in 2013. In 2010, Reznor also collaborated with Atticus Ross on the original score for David Fincher's 2010 film, The Social Network. The duo won a 2010 Golden Globe Award for Best Original Score for a Motion Picture and a 2010 Academy Award for Best Original Score. Reznor and Ross again collaborated with Fincher for the official score the American adaptation of the novel The Girl with the Dragon Tattoo, released in December 2011, before going on to score their third Fincher collaboration with Gone Girl (2014).

Touring
In an interview with BBC Radio 1, Reznor indicated that he would be writing for the majority of 2012 with Nine Inch Nails "in mind". In 2012, he confirmed that he was working on new Nine Inch Nails material and might be performing live again. In February 2013, Reznor announced the return of Nine Inch Nails and revealed tour details. He also revealed that the new lineup of the band included Eric Avery of Jane's Addiction, Adrian Belew of King Crimson, and Joshua Eustis of Telefon Tel Aviv, as well as returning members Alessandro Cortini and Ilan Rubin. However, both Avery and Belew quit before the tour commenced, with former member Robin Finck returning in their place.

On February 23, 2013, it was announced that the band would perform at Fuji Rock Festival, Pukkelpop and Rock 'n' Heim Festival in Hockenheim, Germany in mid-2013. On March 11, 2013, it was announced that they would also play Reading and Leeds Festivals. The Tension 2013 leg of the tour had support from Godspeed You! Black Emperor and Explosions in the Sky.

Line-ups

Festival line-up (2013)
Trent Reznor – lead vocals, guitar, keyboards, synthesizers
Robin Finck – guitar, synthesizers, violin, backup vocals
Joshua Eustis – bass, guitar, synthesizers, percussion, erhu, backup vocals
Alessandro Cortini – keyboards, synthesizers, guitar, percussion, backup vocals
Ilan Rubin – drums, percussion, keyboards, cello, backup vocals

Tension 2013 line-up
Trent Reznor – lead vocals, guitar, keyboards, synthesizers
Robin Finck – guitar, synthesizers, violin, backup vocals
Joshua Eustis – guitar, synthesizers, percussion, saxophone, erhu, backup vocals
Alessandro Cortini – keyboards, synthesizers, guitar, percussion, backup vocals
Ilan Rubin – drums, percussion, keyboards, cello, backup vocals
Pino Palladino – bass, fretless bass
Lisa Fischer – backup vocals
Sharlotte Gibson – backup vocals

NIN 2014 line-up
Trent Reznor – lead vocals, guitar, keyboards, synthesizers
Robin Finck – guitar, synthesizers, violin, backup vocals
Alessandro Cortini – keyboards, synthesizers, guitar, bass, backup vocals
Ilan Rubin – drums, bass, guitar, percussion, keyboards,  backup vocals

Setlist

{{hidden
| headercss = background: #ccccff; font-size: 100%; width: 65%;
| contentcss = text-align: left; font-size: 100%; width: 75%;
| header = August 20, 2013: Scala, London, England
| content =
 "Pinion" 
 "Somewhat Damaged" 
 "The Beginning of the End" 
 "Terrible Lie" 
 "March of the Pigs"
 "Piggy"
 "The Frail" 
 "The Wretched" 
 "Closer"
 "I'm Afraid of Americans" (David Bowie cover)
 "Burn" 
 "Gave Up"
 "Sanctified" 
 "Disappointed" 
 "The Warning" 
 "Wish"
 "Survivalism"
 "Suck" (Pigface cover)
 "The Hand That Feeds"
 "Head Like a Hole"
Encore
 "The Day the World Went Away" 
 "Dead Souls" (Joy Division cover)
 "Hurt" 
}}

{{hidden
| headercss = background: #ccccff; font-size: 100%; width: 65%;
| contentcss = text-align: left; font-size: 100%; width: 75%;
| header = August 24, 2013: Rock en Seine, France
| content =
 "Somewhat Damaged" 
 "The Beginning of the End" 
 "Terrible Lie" 
 "1,000,000"
 "March of the Pigs"
 "Piggy"
 "Closer"
 "Gave Up"
 "Help Me I Am in Hell"
 "Me, I'm Not"
 "Find My Way"
 "The Way Out Is Through"
 "Wish"
 "Only"
 "The Hand That Feeds"
 "Head Like a Hole"
Encore
 "Hurt" 
}}

{{hidden
| headercss = background: #ccccff; font-size: 100%; width: 65%;
| contentcss = text-align: left; font-size: 100%; width: 75%;
| header = September 3, 2013: Troubadour, West Hollywood, California, USA
| content =
 "Pinion" 
 "Somewhat Damaged" 
 "The Beginning of the End" 
 "Terrible Lie" 
 "March of the Pigs"
 "Piggy"
 "The Frail" 
 "The Wretched" 
 "I'm Afraid of Americans" (David Bowie cover)
 "Gave Up"
 "Sanctified" 
 "Disappointed" 
 "The Warning" 
 "Find My Way"
 "Came Back Haunted"
 "Wish"
 "Survivalism"
 "Burn" 
 "The Hand That Feeds"
 "Head Like a Hole"
Encore
 "La Mer"
 "Hurt" 
}}

{{hidden
| headercss = background: #ccccff; font-size: 100%; width: 65%;
| contentcss = text-align: left; font-size: 100%; width: 75%;
| header = Tension Tour 2013
| content =
 "Copy of A"
 "1,000,000"
 "Terrible Lie"
 "March of the Pigs"
 "Piggy"
 "All Time Low"
 "Disappointed"
 "Came Back Haunted"
 "Find My Way"
 "The Frail"/"The Wretched"
 "Survivalism"
 "Running"
 "A Warm Place"
 "Somewhat Damaged"
 "Wish"
 "The Hand That Feeds"
 "Head Like a Hole"
Encore
 "Even Deeper"
 "While I'm Still Here" 
 "Black Noise"
 "Hurt"

"Sanctified", "Reptile", "Burn", "The Day the World Went Away", "Into the Void", "The Big Come Down", All the Love in the World", "Only", "In This Twilight", "Echoplex", "Satellite", "Various Methods of Escape", "I Would For You", "In Two", "I'm Afraid of Americans" and "We Take Mystery (To Bed)" were added at some shows.
}}

Songlist

Tour dates

References

External links
 
 Tour dates

2013 concert tours
2014 concert tours
Nine Inch Nails concert tours